The Graham-Kivett House is a historic house in Tazewell, Tennessee. It was built of limestone around 1800 by William Graham, an immigrant from Ireland who co-founded of Tazewell. The house was designed in the Federal architectural style. By the turn of the 20th century, it belonged to William Yoakum, who sold it to James Kivett, a lawyer. It was inherited by his son, J. K. Kivett, who served as the county judge of Claiborne County until he was "convicted in December 1956 of taking four $1,000 county bonds to a Knoxville bank in June 1954 to obtain a personal loan of $5,400." The house remained in the Kivett family in the 1970s. It has been listed on the National Register of Historic Places since May 29, 1975.

References

National Register of Historic Places in Claiborne County, Tennessee
Federal architecture in Tennessee
Houses completed in 1800